Internazionale Pattaya Football Club commonly known as just Inter Pattaya (Thai สโมสรฟุตบอลอินเตอร์ พัทยา) is a Thai football club based in Pattaya, Chonburi province. Established in late 2015 to compete in the 2016 Regional League Division 2.

Season By Season Record

 The club withdrew after 4 games in 2016
 The club is judged by FA Thailand Regional League part to banned the club indefinite due to outstanding payment.

Coaches
Coaches by year

References

External links
 

Association football clubs established in 2015
Football clubs in Thailand
2015 establishments in Thailand